Minuscule 561 (in the Gregory-Aland numbering), ε 1289 (in the Soden numbering), is a Greek minuscule manuscript of the New Testament, on parchment. Palaeographically it has been assigned to the 13th century. 
Scrivener labelled it by number 521.

The manuscript has complex contents. It has marginalia.

Description 

The codex contains a complete text of the four Gospels on 290 parchment leaves (size ). The manuscript was written by many hands. The writing is in one column per page, 21-25 lines per page.

There is also a division according to the smaller Ammonian Sections, (no references to the Eusebian Canons).

Text 

The Greek text of the codex is a representative of the Byzantine text-type. Hermann von Soden classified to the textual family Kx. Aland did not placed it in any Category.

According to the Claremont Profile Method it represents the textual family Kx in Luke 1, Luke 10. In Luke 20 it has mixed Byzantine text.

History 

According to the INTF it was written in the 13th-century.

The manuscript was written in Italy. It once belonged to Brian Walton in 1656. It was in Caesar de Missy's collection in London in 1748 (along with the codex 560, ℓ 162, ℓ 239). It was added to the list of the New Testament manuscripts by Scrivener (521) and Gregory (561).

Currently the manuscript is housed at the Glasgow University Library (Ms. Hunter 476) in Glasgow.

See also 

 List of New Testament minuscules
 Biblical manuscript
 Textual criticism
 Minuscule 562

References

Further reading 

 Gustavus Haenel, Catalogi librorum manuscriptorum qui in bibliothecis Galliae, Helvetiae, Belgii, Britaniae M., Hispaniae, Lusitaniae Asservantur, Lipsiae 1830
 W. H. P. Hatch, Facsimiles and descriptions of minuscule manuscripts of the New Testament (Cambridge, Mass., 1951), LXXI
 Ian C. Cunningham, Greek Manuscripts in Scotland: summary catalogue, with addendum (Edinburgh, 1982), no. 60

External links 
 Minuscule 561 at the CSNTM

Greek New Testament minuscules
13th-century biblical manuscripts
University of Glasgow Library collection